Clanton can refer to different things:

People
 Cydney Clanton (born 1989), American professional golfer
 David A. Clanton (born 1944), chair of the Federal Trade Commission 
 Denny Clanton (born 1982), American soccer (football) player
 George Clanton, American electronic musician
 Ike Clanton (1847–1887), and Billy Clanton (1862–1881), who were involved in the Gunfight at the O.K. Corral
 James Holt Clanton (1827–1871), Confederate general during the American Civil War
 J. Caleb Clanton (born 1978), Professor of Philosophy at Lipscomb University

Places
 Clanton, Alabama, a town in the United States
 Clanton, Mississippi, a fictional town in the United States and the setting for several books by John Grisham